The Municipality of Kuzma is a municipality in northeastern Slovenia. It gets its name from the largest settlement and administrative seat of the municipality, Kuzma. The current mayor is Jožef Škalič.

Settlements
In addition to the municipal seat of Kuzma, the municipality also includes the following settlements:
 Dolič
 Gornji Slaveči
 Matjaševci
 Trdkova

References

External links

Municipality of Kuzma on Geopedia
Kuzma municipal site

Kuzma
1998 establishments in Slovenia